Xuan Son virus is a single-stranded, enveloped, negative-sense RNA virus of the genus Mobatvirus.

Natural reservoir 
It was isolated in Pomona roundleaf bats in Xuân Sơn National Park, a nature reserve in Thanh Sơn District, Phú Thọ Province, Vietnam, within a 50-mile radius of Hanoi.

References 

Hantaviridae
Zoonoses